Solumbra is a line of sun protection clothing and a patented fabric that was introduced in 1992.

History

Solumbra was developed by Shaun Hughes, who was diagnosed and treated for malignant melanoma at age 26 during a visit to Memorial Sloan-Kettering Cancer Center.  He felt that traditional UV protection was insufficient: he would tan through sunscreen and sunburn through his summer clothing.  Based upon medical research and involvement of UV and medical experts, Hughes developed the Solumbra line of fabric and clothing.

Solumbra entered the United States marketplace in 1992. Solumbra was reviewed under medical device regulations by the U.S. Food and Drug Administration (FDA) and Health Canada. No sun protective clothing had previously been reviewed as a medical device in the United States or Canada.  Solumbra offered improved and superior ultraviolet (UV) protection compared to a conventional 30 SPF sunscreen and typical summer clothing.  Solumbra sun protective clothing is rated at 100+ SPF.

The Solumbra logo depicts the sun’s rays eclipsed by effective sun protection that, in turn, provides an area of safe shade.

Technology

The main goal of Solumbra fabrics is to prevent UV from transmitting through the garment's fibers and apertures (holes between the fibers). Hughes developed the technology without treatments or coatings that could lose their effectiveness and photoprotection after use, laundering, and exposure to environmental factors.

Solumbra clothing designs are based on published medical guidelines. Designs are typically long-sleeved, long-legged, or wide-brimmed to cover the maximum amount of skin.

Research
Sun protection clothing can offer superior photoprotection because of some common problems with sunscreen: misapplication, low durability, poor reapplication behavior, and poor cosmetic elegance.

R. Sayre was the lead researcher of in vitro SPF testing for traditional summer fabrics. This revealed that traditional summer clothing in North America offered less than 15 SPF protection, the minimum level recommended by doctors. These traditional summer fabrics tested between SPF 59 when dry and SPF 39 when wet.  Nicholas Lowe and R Sayre followed this up with in vivo research.  They found that Solumbra achieved over 50 SPF when dry or wet.

In vivo research spearheaded by J Menter and Sayre, published in the Journal of the American Academy of Dermatology, showed that most mice contracted squamous cell carcinoma (SCC) skin cancers through typical summer fabrics, and mice protected by Solumbra fabrics did not incur skin cancers. Subsequent research by Menter and Sayre found that specific Solumbra fabrics provided photoprotection for mice against injury from visible light when sensitized with the photosensitizer, ALA, compared to insufficient protection by typical summer fabric.  Research was just presented by an independent researcher in March 2012 showing that Solumbra fabrics now offer 100+ SPF even after 500 durability cycles.

References

External links
 Special clothing combines sunblock ability and summer fashion
 Work out
 Dive (safely) into summer
 Compare Coolibar, Solumbra and other sun protective clothing
  Evening Magazine TV show highlighting Solumbra and Shaun Hughes's melanoma experience
  Sunwear clothing can boost protection from burns

Clothing brands of the United States
Safety clothing
Sun tanning